Chaetorellia carthami is a species of tephritid or fruit flies in the genus Chaetorellia of the family Tephritidae.

Distribution
Europe, East to Central Asia, S to Israel & Iraq.

References

Tephritinae
Insects described in 1929
Diptera of Europe
Diptera of Asia
Taxa named by Aleksandr Stackelberg